= Gul Imam railway station =

Railway station in Pakistan

Coordinates: 32.270833°N 70.524167°E

General information
- Owner: Ministry of Railways

Other information
- Station code: GLX

History
- Former names: Great Indian Peninsula Railway
Location

Gul Imam railway station (Urdu: گل امام ریلوے اسٹیشن) is located in Pakistan. It is located at the longitude of 70.511825 and latitude of 32.258485.

== See also ==
- List of railway stations in Pakistan
- Pakistan Railways
